Union Star could refer to:

Union Star, Kentucky
 Union Star, Missouri, a city in DeKalb County, Missouri, 
 M.V. Union Star lost 19 December 1981, see Penlee lifeboat disaster